The Donegal School District is a school district covering the Boroughs of Marietta and Mount Joy and East Donegal Township and the southern portion of Mount Joy Township in Lancaster County, Pennsylvania. It is a member of Lancaster-Lebanon Intermediate Unit (IU) 13.  The district operates one high school, one junior high school, one intermediate school, and one primary school.

Schools 

 Donegal Primary School K-2 (formerly Donegal Springs Elementary School), Mount Joy, Pennsylvania
 Donegal Intermediate School 3-6 (formerly Donegal Middle School and Riverview Elementary School), Marietta, Pennsylvania
 Donegal Junior High School 7-8 (formerly Donegal High School), Mount Joy, Pennsylvania
 Donegal Senior High School 9-12, Mount Joy, Pennsylvania

Notable alumni
David Hickernell, state representative
Bruce Sutter, former Major League Baseball relief pitcher
Swerve Strickland, Professional Wrestler

References

School districts in Lancaster County, Pennsylvania